The Pope Street Bridge is a stone bridge carrying Pope Street over the Napa River in St. Helena, California. Built by R. H. Pithie in 1894, the bridge is the oldest stone bridge in Napa County. The stone used to build the bridge came from a local quarry on Monticello Road near Mount George Grade. The bridge was designed for horse-drawn vehicles but has withstood automobile traffic; it also survived the 1906 San Francisco earthquake without damage.

The bridge was added to the National Register of Historic Places on October 5, 1972.

References

External links

Road bridges on the National Register of Historic Places in California
Bridges completed in 1894
Transportation buildings and structures in Napa County, California
Bridges in the San Francisco Bay Area
St. Helena, California
1894 establishments in California
National Register of Historic Places in Napa County, California
Stone arch bridges in the United States